Nam Phong National Park is a national park in Thailand's Khon Kaen and Chaiyaphum provinces. This mountainous park, in two separate sections, encompasses part of the Ubol Ratana Dam reservoir and also features rock formations and cliff-top viewpoints. The park is named for the Nam Phong River, impounded by the dam.

Geography
The park's area is 123,125 rai ~ . The park is located in the Phu Phan Kham mountain range in the northern section and the Phu Meng mountain range in the southern section. Rivers such as the Nam Phong, Chi and Choen are fed by sources within the park's boundaries.

Attractions
Part of the Ubol Ratana Dam reservoir is in the park's northern section and is located by the park headquarters. Hin Chang Si viewpoint, also in the park's northern section, offers views over the reservoir, forested landscapes and east to Khon Kaen. There are also prehistoric rock paintings at this location.

There are rock formations at Pha Chan Dai and Kham Phon. There are viewpoints at Pha Sawan and Hin Chang Si. Phu Meng mountain's forests host a wide variety of animal and plant life.

The Huai Khe waterfall is in the park's southern section.

Flora and fauna
The park's main forest type is deciduous dipterocarp, covering 80% of the park's area. The remainder of the park is mixed deciduous forest and grassland.

Tree species include Shorea obtusa, Shorea siamensis, Dipterocarpus obtusifolius, wild almond, Annamese burada, Hopea ferrea and Cycas.

The park serves as a sanctuary for animals including wild boar, northern red muntjac (Muntiacus muntjak vaginalis), porcupine, pangolin and Siamese hare. Bird life includes white wagtail, grey wagtail, Richard's pipit, sooty-headed bulbul, kingfisher and munia.

See also
List of national parks of Thailand
List of Protected Areas Regional Offices of Thailand

References

External links
 Concise Nam Phong National Park information from the Tourism Authority of Thailand

National parks of Thailand
Geography of Khon Kaen province
Tourist attractions in Khon Kaen province
Geography of Chaiyaphum province
Tourist attractions in Chaiyaphum province